Confronting a Serial Killer is an American documentary television miniseries directed and produced by Joe Berlinger. It explores Jillian Lauren, as she lures and investigates Sam Little, the most prolific serial killer in American history. It consists of 5-episodes and premiered on April 18, 2021, on Starz.

Plot
The series follows Jillian Lauren, as she lures and investigates Sam Little, the most prolific serial killer in American history.

Episodes

Production
Jillian Lauren initially began writing a mystery novel, and while interviewing detective Mitzi Roberts of The Los Angeles Police Department she told Lauren: "Well, I’m proud of them all, but I did catch this serial killer Sam Little once. That was pretty cool." Lauren began writing a non-fiction book about Little, and spent more than 40 hours interviewing him, where he confessed to multiple murders and sent her drawings of his victims. In December 2018, Lauren wrote about her experiencing interviewing Little for The Cut. Joe Berlinger read the article and thought it would be interesting for a feature-length film or documentary series and met with Lauren.

Release
The series had its world premiere with the first two episodes debuting at South by Southwest on March 16, 2021. It premiered in the United States on Starz on April 18, 2021.

Reception
On Rotten Tomatoes, the series holds an approval rating of 83% based on 6 reviews, with an average rating of 8.33/10. On Metacritic, the series holds a rating of 55 out of 100, based on 4 critics, indicating "mixed or average reviews".

References

External links
 

2021 American television series debuts
2021 American television series endings
2020s American television miniseries
2020s American documentary television series
English-language television shows
Television series based on actual events
True crime television series
Starz original programming
Television series by Lionsgate Television